Hugo Soto-Martinez is an American labor organizer and politician, currently serving as a member of the Los Angeles City Council for the 13th district since 2022. A member of the Democratic Party and the Democratic Socialists of America, Soto-Martinez defeated incumbent Mitch O'Farrell in the 2022 general election.

Early life and career 
Soto-Martinez was born and raised in South Los Angeles to two Mexican immigrant parents who worked as street vendors. When Soto-Martinez was 14, his father suffered from a back injury that made him disabled and unable to work. Because of that, he dropped out of high school and started working at a hotel at the age of 16 to help his family.

During that time, Soto-Martinez's older brother was arrested after he was placing a call from a phone booth, and after, Soto-Martinez received a ticket for littering which noted his perceived resistance to an officer which was upheld by the presiding judge. Soon after, he and his friend were caught in an entrapment operation, with Soto-Martinez ending up in probation.

Because of his circumstances, he returned to high school and later started studying political science and criminology at University of California, Irvine in 2001 while still working at the hotel. In 2006, his last year of college, a co-worker asked if he would join a trade union they were organizing which he did, winning fair wages and free family healthcare. He became an organizer for UNITE HERE Local 11 and later became involved with the Los Angeles chapter of the Democratic Socialists of America. He traveled and canvassed for politicians like Barack Obama, against Joe Arpaio, and helped flip the two Georgia Senate seats with Stacey Abrams.

In 2020, he was designated by his union to be the labor liaison on Measure J, a ballot initiative to allocate at least 10% of Los Angeles County's funding for community reinvestment and incarceration alternatives. In June 2021, the measure was blocked by Judge Mary Strobel as unconstitutional.

Political career

Los Angeles City Council 
In June of 2021, Soto-Martinez announced that he was running in the 2022 Los Angeles elections in District 13 against incumbent Mitch O'Farrell. Soto-Martinez criticized O'Farrel's handling of Echo Park's homeless population as well as his policies towards police budget and housing development within the district. In the primary, Soto-Martinez led O'Farrell by nine points, with the pair going into a runoff. In the general election, Soto-Martinez ousted O'Farrell with 57.24% of the vote.

References 

Year of birth missing (living people)
Living people
California Democrats
University of California, Irvine alumni
Mexican-American people in California politics
Los Angeles City Council members
21st-century American politicians
UNITE HERE
Democratic Socialists of America politicians from California